Dicellandra is a genus of flowering plants belonging to the family Melastomataceae.

Its native range is Western Tropical Africa to Uganda and Angola.

Species:

Dicellandra barteri 
Dicellandra descoingsii 
Dicellandra glanduligera

References

Melastomataceae
Melastomataceae genera